St. Ignatius School is a Roman Catholic school in Winnipeg, Manitoba. It was opened on January 12, 1911, by the Parish of St. Ignatius. The school is located in the neighborhood of Rockwood in the River Heights area. The school and church share one city block, bounded by Corydon Avenue to the north, Jessie Avenue to the south, Stafford Street to the east and Harrow Street to the west. 

The school serves 240 co-ed students from Nursery to Grade 8. 

The school is the only Catholic school N-8 in Winnipeg that does not wear uniforms.

An electrical fire on February 20, 2007, damaged the oldest remaining wing - originally built in 1956. These were rebuilt and classes resumed by the fall of 2007.

See also
 List of Jesuit schools

External links
 School website
 St. Ignatius Parish website

Private schools in Manitoba
Educational institutions established in 1911
Ignatius, Winnipeg
1911 establishments in Canada

River Heights, Winnipeg
Catholic elementary schools in Manitoba
Roman Catholic schools in Manitoba